Leonardo Abálsamo (born 3 June 1984) is a retired Argentine footballer.

He previously played for Club de Deportes La Serena in Chile, where he scored 3 goals in 7 matches, and Correcaminos UAT in the Mexican Primera A.

References

External links
Profile at BDFA

1984 births
Living people
Argentine footballers
Argentine expatriate footballers
Association football forwards
Club Atlético Platense footballers
Correcaminos UAT footballers
Deportes La Serena footballers
Santiago Morning footballers
Club Almagro players
Independiente Rivadavia footballers
San Martín de Mendoza footballers
Asociación Atlética Luján de Cuyo players
Sportivo Italiano footballers
Deportivo Maipú players
Alumni de Villa María players
Club y Biblioteca Ramón Santamarina footballers
Hong Kong First Division League players
Expatriate footballers in Hong Kong
Happy Valley AA players
Argentine expatriate sportspeople in Chile
Argentine expatriate sportspeople in Mexico
Argentine expatriate sportspeople in Hong Kong
Expatriate footballers in Chile
Expatriate footballers in Mexico
Footballers from Buenos Aires